Alberto Argibay (25 October 1932 – 10 September 2007) was an Argentine actor. He appeared in 51 films and television shows between 1958 and 1998. He starred in the film Circe, which was entered into the 14th Berlin International Film Festival.

Selected filmography
 I Was Born in Buenos Aires (1959)
 Dos tipos con suerte (1960)
 Alias Gardelito (1961)
 The Old Young People (1962)
 Circe (1964)
 Amor libre (1969)
 La sartén por el mango (1974)
 What's Autumn? (1977)
 Contragolpe (1979)
 Andrea Celeste (1979)

References

External links

1932 births
2007 deaths
Argentine male film actors
People from Santa Cruz Province, Argentina